Coryn is both a surname and a given name, and a variation of the name Corina or Corinne. Notable people with the surname or given name include:


Surname
Jana Coryn (born 1992), Belgian football striker
Laetitia Coryn (born 1984), French comic artist, illustrator, and voice actor

Given
Quirijn Boel (1620-1668), also referred to as Coryn Boel, Flemish engraver
Coryn Labecki (born 1992), American racing cyclist

Fictional
Coryn, also known as Nyroc, a barn owl in the book series Guardians of Ga'Hoole

See also
Corryn
Corinne (disambiguation)
Corrine (disambiguation)
Corrinne
Corin
Corine (disambiguation)
Korin (disambiguation)
Korine
Corrin (disambiguation)